Moorea Seal is an author and founder of her eponymous brand.

Life and career 
Seal grew up in England and moved to Nevada City, California when she was eight years old. She graduated from Seattle Pacific University in 2009 with a degree in Illustration and was awarded GOLD Alumna of the Year in 2017. Seal was an early user of Pinterest and has been featured as one of their business success stories. Seal began her self made career by blogging in 2009. Her first small business, a handmade jewelry line, was sustained from 2010-2013. Her online retail store, featuring her own work and product from over 40 designers, opened in July 2013, with a physical location opening in May 2014. She subsequently signed a two-book deal with Sasquatch Books. Her journal The 52 Lists Project went viral and between 2015-2021, Seal has published 12 books, journals and paper goods with over 1.2 million copies sold. The Moorea Seal company donates 7% of their proceeds to various charities.

Bibliography 

 The 52 Lists Projects: A Year of Weekly Journaling Inspiration. 2015. Sasquatch Books. 
 52 Lists for Happiness: Weekly Journaling Inspiration for Positivity, Balance, and Joy. 2016. Sasquatch Books. 
 Make Yourself at Home: Design Your Space to Discover Your True Self. 2017. Sasquatch Books. 
 52 Lists for Togetherness: Journaling Inspiration to Deepen Connections with Your Loved Ones. 2018. Sasquatch Books. 
 52 Lists "My Weekly List" Desk Pad. 2018. Sasquatch Books. 
 52 Lists "To Do List" Notepad. 2018. Sasquatch Books. 
 52 Lists Postcards: For Connecting with Loved Ones Near and Far. 2018. Sasquatch Books. 
 52 Lists Planner: Includes Prompts for Well-Being, Reflection, Personal Growth, and Daily Gratitude. Coral Edition. 2019. Sasquatch Books. 
 52 Lists for Calm: Journaling Inspiration for Soothing Anxiety and Creating a Peaceful Life. 2019. Sasquatch Books. 
 52 Lists for Bravery: Journaling Inspiration for Courage, Resilience, and Inner Strength. 2020. Sasquatch Books. 
 52 Lists Planner: Includes Prompts for Well-Being, Reflection, Personal Growth, and Daily Gratitude. Black Floral Edition. 2020. Sasquatch Books. 
 My 52 Lists Project: Journaling Inspiration for Kids!. 2021. Sasquatch Books.

References 

Living people
American women company founders
American company founders
Year of birth missing (living people)
21st-century American women